Darva Conger (born September 21, 1965) is a former emergency department nurse who in 2000 was selected as the winner of the reality television show Who Wants to Marry a Multi-Millionaire?

Conger served ten years in the United States Air Force, in active duty and the reserves and was stationed at Hill Air Force Base in Utah, Scott Air Force Base, near St. Louis and also in Korea. She was a medical services specialist and became a staff sergeant.

She studied nursing at Southern Illinois University at the Edwardsville and Carbondale campuses, graduating magna cum laude.

Conger's mother was American actress Susan Harrison.

Who Wants to Marry a Multi-Millionaire? and aftermath
In the show, which aired as a single two-hour broadcast on February 15, 2000, 50 women competed to be the bride of an unknown millionaire they did not see during the show, except in silhouette. At the end of the show, "millionaire" Rick Rockwell chose Conger to be his wife and married her on the spot. In addition to being wed to Rockwell, Conger won a 3-carat (600 mg) diamond ring and more than $100,000 in prizes. After the honeymoon, it was announced that Conger was seeking an annulment, saying Rockwell had misrepresented himself. The annulment was finalized on April 5, 2000. Conger was the focus of media attention for not only winning the "contest" but also for getting an annulment so quickly after the marriage.

After the show aired, Conger made numerous public comments about how she was offended by Rockwell's forcibly kissing her on stage, that they never consummated their marriage, and how the entire episode went against her morals. She then posed nude for Playboy magazine in August 2000. In February 2001, Conger and Rockwell appeared on The Larry King Show and sparred over comments each of them had made about the other, but Conger also said that she should not have appeared on the program at all and was harsh in her statements about Rockwell.

Later life
Conger faced Olga Korbut on an episode of Celebrity Boxing which aired on May 22, 2002. Conger won by unanimous decision.

Later, in 2003, she married physician assistant Jim Arellano, with whom she had one son, Cassius.  They divorced in 2009, and she and her son live in Northern California while she works as a nurse anesthetist.

References

External links

1965 births
Living people
Reality show winners
Southern Illinois University alumni
United States Air Force non-commissioned officers
United States Air Force reservists
Women in the United States Air Force
People from Carbondale, Illinois
American anesthesiologists